Phytoecia sylvatica is a species of beetle in the family Cerambycidae. It was described by Hintz in 1916, originally under the genus Obereopsis. It is known from the Democratic Republic of the Congo. It contains varietas Phytoecia sylvatica var. atroapicalis.

References

Phytoecia
Beetles described in 1916
Endemic fauna of the Democratic Republic of the Congo